David William Rowsen (D. W. R. or David W. R.) Morgan (September 16, 1892 – April 30, 1973) was an American mechanical engineer and business executive at the Westinghouse Electric Corporation, known as 74th president of the American Society of Mechanical Engineers in the year 1955-56.

Biography

Youth, education and early career 
Morgan was born in 1892 in Martins Ferry, Ohio, son of William E. Morgan and Sarah (Thomas) Morgan. In 1913, at the age of 21, he obtained his MSc in mechanical engineering from Ohio Northern University.

After his graduation in 1913 Morgan started his lifelong career at the Westinghouse Electrical Corporation in Philadelphia. By 1917 he was engineer at the condenser department, where he was later promoted to Engineer in Charge of the Condenser Department. In 1926 he got appointed manager condenser and internal combustion engineering in the internal combustion engine department of the Westinghouse Electric.

Further career and acknowledgement 
In the 1930s Morgan had become assistant manager of engineering of the South Philadelphia plant of Westinghouse Electric. In 1941 he got appointed vice president of the South Philadelphia plant.

From 1948 to 1953 Morgan was general manager of Westinghouse Steam Division, and from 1953 until his retirement late 1955 he was vice president of Westinghouse Electric Co. After his retirement he was Professorship of Engineering at the Drexel Institute of Technology, now the Drexel University.

Morgan was awarded the Westinghouse Order of Merit in 1942. In 1950 he was awarded the honorary doctorate in engineering from Drexel Institute of Technology. Morgan was elected president of the American Society of Mechanical Engineers for the year 1955-56. He had been elected Fellow of the ASME, and was member of the Hoover Medal Board of Award.

Selected publications 
Articles, a selection
 Morgan, D. W. R. "Central Station Steam-Power Generation." Westinghouse Engineer 10 (1950): 7-17.

Patents, a selection
 Morgan, David WR. "Large jet condenser." U.S. Patent No. 1,457,788. 5 Jun. 1923.
 Morgan, David WR. "Surface condenser." U.S. Patent No. 1,578,057. 23 Mar. 1926.
 Morgan, David WR. "House electric." U.S. Patent No. 1,684,406. 18 Sep. 1928.
 Morgan, David WR. "Ejector apparatus." U.S. Patent No 2,033,843, 10 March 1936.
 Tuley, Charles B., and David WR Morgan. "Condenser apparatus." U.S. Patent No. 2,180,840. 21 Nov. 1939.

References

External links 
 D.W.R. Morgan, engineer in the Condenser Department, Westinghouse Electric Corporation Steam Division photographs.
 Group photograph of Westinghouse employees, Hagley Digital Archives

1892 births
1973 deaths
Engineers from Ohio
American business executives
Ohio Northern University alumni
Drexel University faculty
People from Martins Ferry, Ohio
Presidents of the American Society of Mechanical Engineers
20th-century American engineers